The Bar at the Crossing is a 1972 French adventure film directed by Alain Levent. It was entered into the 22nd Berlin International Film Festival. It stars Belgian singer Jacques Brel.

Plot
Vincent Van Horst (Jacques Brel) is a hard-drinking bon viveur who loves his freedom and his women. In 1916, he leaves Europe, which is torn apart by the war, and moves to Canada, intending to meet up with Maria, the only woman he ever loved. On the way to Canada, he meets a young boy who dreams about fighting in the European war. When Vincent arrives at the Bar de la fourche, managed by Maria, he finds her looking older. He finds consolation in another woman, Annie, who looks down on him and drives Vincent and Olivier to fight a duel against each other.

Cast
 Jacques Brel as Vincent van Horst
 Rosy Varte as Maria
 Pierre-François Pistorio as Olivier
 Isabelle Huppert as Annie
 Malka Ribowska as Jane Holly
 Bernard La Jarrige as Nicky Holly
 Gabriel Jabbour as Mosé
 Gérard Victor as Robinson
 Guy Parigot as Le juge
 Robert Angebaud as Le patron
 Luc Hinterseber as Jimmy
 Claude Baret as John Mc Brown
 Gérard Darmon as Le valet
 Diane Kurys as Christie
 Marcel Ory as Le patron de l'hôtel
 Jean-Claude Bouillaud as Carletti
 Andrée Champeaux as La patronne de la maison close

See also
 Isabelle Huppert on screen and stage

References

External links

1972 films
1970s French-language films
1970s adventure films
Films directed by Alain Levent
Films set in the 1910s
French World War I films
Jacques Brel
French adventure films
1970s French films